Dennis Richards is a Canadian politician. He represented the electoral district of Cole Harbour-Eastern Passage in the Nova Scotia House of Assembly from 1993 to 1998. He was a member of the Nova Scotia Liberal Party.

Richards was elected a municipal councillor for Halifax County, Nova Scotia in 1988. He entered provincial politics in the 1993 election, winning the Cole Harbour-Eastern Passage riding. A backbench member of the John Savage government, Richards served as chair of the government caucus. Richards did not reoffer in the 1998 election.

References

Living people
Nova Scotia Liberal Party MLAs
Nova Scotia municipal councillors
Year of birth missing (living people)